National Renewal (Spanish: Renovación Nacional, RN), was a Christian democratic and right-leaning political party in Peru that was founded in 1992 in Lima by conservative politician Rafael Rey. The party was dissolved in 2012, following the 2011 general election, as it did not participate formally in the election, as Rey ran with the Force 2011 as the second running mate of Keiko Fujimori. The party was part of the National Unity Alliance from 2001 until 2006.

History 
The party was founded in 1992 by Rafael Rey, who until then had been a Congressman representing the Democratic Front, being officially registered on June 21, 2005.

References 

Political parties established in 1992
Political parties disestablished in 2012
Christian democratic parties in South America
Conservative parties in Peru
Conservative parties in South America